Union Pond is a  pond in Wareham, Massachusetts. The pond is located southeast of Mill Pond. Route 25 runs north of the pond, Routes 6 and 28 runs south of the pond, and Glen Charlie Road runs west of the pond.

External links
Environmental Protection Agency

Wareham, Massachusetts
Ponds of Plymouth County, Massachusetts
Ponds of Massachusetts